Callionymus altipinnis, the highfin deepwater dragonet, is a species of dragonet native to the Pacific Ocean around China, Taiwan and Vietnam.

References

altipinnis
Fish described in 1981
Taxa named by Ronald Fricke